Women is a 1999 comedy-drama film written and directed by Peter Greenaway and starring John Standing, Matthew Delamere, and Vivian Wu. An international co-production of the United Kingdom, the Netherlands, Luxembourg, and Germany, it was entered into the 1999 Cannes Film Festival.

Plot
After the death of his wife Amelia, wealthy businessman Philip Emmenthal (John Standing) and his son Storey (Matthew Delamere) open their own private harem in their family residence in Geneva. They get the idea while watching Federico Fellini's  and after Storey is "given" a woman, Simato (Shizuka Inoh), to waive her pachinko debts. They sign one-year contracts with eight (and a half) women to this effect.

The women each have a gimmick (one is a nun, another a kabuki performer, etc.). Philip soon becomes dominated by his favorite of the concubines, Palmira (Polly Walker), who has no interest in Storey as a lover, despite what their contract might stipulate. Philip dies, the concubines' contracts expire, and Storey is left alone with Giulietta (the titular  as an amputee) and of course the money and the houses.

While the film deals with and graphically describes diverse sexual acts in conversation, the film does not feature any sex scenes as such, though it does contain several instances of male nudity.

Cast

Production
Toni Collette said Peter Greenaway chose her by accident for the role of Griselda. "I went in for another part and I had just had my head shaved and I had a Buddha hanging around my neck. Afterwards I thought, 'This is going to teach me to go to an audition looking like that'."

Reception
 Women received mixed reviews. As of November 2019 it holds a 41% rating on Rotten Tomatoes,
and  36/100 (an average of critics' reviews) on Metacritic, indicating "generally unfavorable reviews".

The film opened at the box office at #50 with $92,000 and grossed $424,123 domestically.

References

External links
 
 
 
 
 
 8½ Women at petergreenaway.org.uk

1999 films
1999 comedy-drama films
British comedy-drama films
Dutch comedy-drama films
Films set in Geneva
German comedy-drama films
1990s English-language films
English-language Dutch films
English-language German films
English-language Luxembourgian films
1990s Italian-language films
1990s Japanese-language films
Latin-language films
Films directed by Peter Greenaway
Films shot in Luxembourg
Films shot in Japan
British independent films
Lionsgate films
Dutch independent films
German independent films
Erotic drama films
1999 independent films
Luxembourgian comedy-drama films
Luxembourgian independent films
1999 multilingual films
British multilingual films
Japan in non-Japanese culture
German multilingual films
1990s British films
1990s German films
English-language comedy-drama films